Ticketek is an Australian event ticketing company. Founded in 1979, the company is owned by TEG Pty Ltd with its headquarters in Sydney and operates ticketing operations for entertainment and sporting events in Australia and New Zealand. There are companies using the name Ticketek in other countries however these are not a part of the Ticketek Australia/NZ operations but are a part of Ticketek Pty Ltd/Softix Pty Ltd.

Ticketek Pty Ltd sell the Softix premium ticketing software created by Softix Pty Ltd (a subsidiary of Ticketek) to other countries. 
Ticketek Pty Ltd also own the simplified ticket management company Eventopia.

Ticketek was part of PBL's Consolidated Press Holdings until it was sold to PBL's internet arm ecorp, in 1999, two years after introducing online ticketing in Australia. Ticketek was ecorp's major source of profits.

Ticketek was originally called Best Available Seating Service (Queensland) Pty Ltd (BASS). It was one of at least three Australian Best Available Seating Service operations (which originated from the Bay Area Seating Service (BASS) of San Francisco, USA), the others being BASS (owned by the Adelaide Festival Centre Trust and still operating) and BASS Victoria owned by the Victorian Government under the auspices of the Victorian Arts Centre Trust until it was partially, then completely, bought out by Ticketmaster.

In November 2000, Ticketek formed a Hong Kong company called Ticketek Hong Kong in a joint venture with the Hong Kong Ticketing Alliance. In early 2003, ecorp sold its 50% stake in the Hong Kong operation to HKTA, with the venture being renamed Hong Kong Ticketing Limited.

Ticketek sells around 18 million tickets to over 13,000 events annually.  The company has ticketing contracts with certain venues such as the Melbourne Cricket Ground, the Sydney Cricket Ground, Sydney Super Dome and the Sydney Entertainment Centre. It was the provider of ticketing services for the 2000 Summer Olympics in Sydney.

Tickets

Buying Tickets
When an event goes on sale, tickets can be purchased online, by phone, through the app or in person. Ticketek operates "outlets" at major shopping centers, some news agencies, pharmacies and other locations. These agencies do not accept telephone bookings or enquiries which must be made online or by using the national charge by phone enquiry number, 132 849.

Ticketing options
Tickets can be printed at home (ezyticket), printed at a Ticketek outlet or sent through the mail.
Some events allow patrons to enter and exit using digital tickets on smart phones through email, passbook/iPhone app or website/sms.

Notable events and venues
Ticketek manage the ticketing for Accor Stadium, Qudos Bank Arena, Sydney Cricket Ground, Allianz Stadium, Melbourne Cricket Ground (MCG), Rod Laver Arena, AAMI Park, Her Majesty's Theatre, Crown Entertainment Complex, Suncorp Stadium, Brisbane Entertainment Centre, Newcastle Entertainment Centre, WIN Entertainment Centre Wollongong, Canberra Stadium, National Gallery of Australia Canberra, Adelaide Entertainment Centre, Adelaide Oval, Crown Perth Entertainment Complex, Regal Theatre and the Perth Arena.

Ticketek also sells tickets to events including the Australian Open Tennis Tournament, Royal Melbourne Show, Royal Adelaide Show and Clipsal 500 Adelaide.

Criticism
Ticketek has received criticism for excessive booking fees and delivery charges. A 2009 review of ticketing agencies by the Australian consumer magazine, Choice, criticised the ticketing industry for lack of competition, insufficiently transparent pricing, and for a lack of information on seat location before booking.  While in 2012, Ticketek, in conjunction with Ticketmaster, received the annual Shonky Award from Choice for its excessive fees. Ticketek Pty Ltd was penalised $2.5 million for misusing its market power
The Federal Court in Sydney penalised Ticketek Pty Ltd $2.5 million for taking advantage of its market power following action by the Australian Competition and Consumer Commission.

Ticketek's system collapsed during the week 1 AFL finals on sale in 2018, angering thousands of fans. The AFL was forced to reschedule the sale for the following day.

References

Entertainment companies established in 1979
Entertainment companies of Australia
Companies based in Sydney
Australian companies established in 1979